Hans Ansgar Reinhold (1897–1968) was a Roman Catholic priest born in Hamburg, Germany. Reinhold took part in the Roman Catholic resistance to the Nazi regime until taking refuge in the United States. He was a prominent liturgical reformer whose work was influential in shaping the changes to the Mass made at the Second Vatican Council. Reinhold was also a prominent advocate for the introduction of modernist architectural ideas to the construction of Catholic churches in the United States.

Books
The American Parish and the Roman Liturgy: An Essay in seven chapters (Macmillan, 1958), 
Bringing the Mass to the people (Helicon Press, 1960), 
The dynamics of liturgy (Macmillan, 1961), 
Speaking of liturgical architecture (Daughters of St. Paul, 1961), 
H.A.R.: The Autobiography of Father Reinhold (Herder and Herder, 1968) 
[Edited compilation]The Soul Afire: Revelations of the Mystics (Image Books, 1973), 
Literatur: Gerhard Besier, Peter Schmidt-Eppendorf (Hrsg,) Hans Ansgar Reinhold, Schriften und Briefwechsel, 588 S.,Aschendorf Münster 2011

References

Liturgists
1897 births
1968 deaths